The Olympia Building is a landmark at the absolute center of Atlanta, Five Points in Downtown Atlanta.

History 
The building was built between 1935 and 1936, architects Ivey and Crook. Since 2003, a flashing Coca-Cola sign has stood on top of the building, the space for which Coke pays $8,641 a month in rent (2012 data). As of September 2012 the building was owned by the State of Georgia (as a result of a $3.6 million gift from the Robert W. Woodruff Foundation just before the 1996 Summer Olympics) and was for sale, valued at $2.45 million. A complex rehabilitation of the building, beginning in 2015, includes the removal of all non-historic elements, of which there were many. This left only the building's terra cotta and marble facade and portions of its foundation. The iconic metal canopy will be reconstructed from historic images. The building currently houses a two-story Walgreens.

References

Ivey and Crook buildings
Buildings and structures in Atlanta
City of Atlanta-designated historic sites
Buildings and structures completed in 1936